The Rt Rev  William Dickson  (1745–1804) was Bishop of Down and Connor from  1784 to 1804. He was educated at Eton and Hertford College, Oxford  and died in post on  19 September 1804.

Life
He was son of an English clergyman, James Dickson, who was dean of Down from 1768 till 1787. He was educated at Eton College, where he formed a lifelong friendship with Charles James Fox and several of Fox's nearest friends, one of whom, Lord Robert Spencer, became his executor. He entered Hertford College, Oxford, graduating B.A. 1767, M.A. 1770, and D.D. by diploma 1784.

Dickson was first chaplain to Robert Henley, 1st Earl of Northington, who became lord-lieutenant of Ireland 3 June 1783, and was promoted to the bishopric of Down and Connor by patent dated 12 December following. He was indebted to Fox for this rapid promotion, and Richard Mant says the news came in a letter to this effect: "I have ceased to be minister, and you are bishop of Down". Dickson was thus the official superior of his father, who was still dean of Down.

Dickson died at the house of his old friend Fox, in Arlington Street, London, 19 September 1804, and was buried in the cemetery of St. James's Chapel, Hampstead Road, where a monument was erected to his memory.

Family
Dickson married a Miss Symmes, and by her had six children, of whom one son, John, was archdeacon of Down 1796–1814; another, William, prebendary of Rathsarkan or Rasharkin, in the diocese of Connor, 1800–50; and a third, Stephen, prebendary of Carncastle, in the same diocese, 1802–49.

Notes

Attribution

People educated at Eton College
Alumni of Hertford College, Oxford
18th-century Anglican bishops in Ireland
19th-century Anglican bishops in Ireland
Bishops of Down and Connor (Church of Ireland)
1804 deaths
1745 births